The National Award of Recognition for Performing Arts is one of the categories in the National Award of Recognition presented annually by the President of the Maldives to acknowledge, encourage and honor the outstanding contribution of individuals in film production, direction, acting, singing and music composition. The National Award is the most prestigious award given in Maldives. Established in 1979, National Award was given in major two categories; National Award of Honor and National Award of Recognition, which is further categorized based on the honored fields.

The first recipient of the award was music composer Ibrahim Ahmed, who has been noted as the local "backbone" for modernizing the old-fashioned music into the latest trend. Among the awardees, singer Fareedha Mohamed is the only posthumous recipient. Actor Chilhiya Moosa Manik, actor Kopee Mohamed Rasheed, Kashima Ahmed Shakir and director Fathimath Nahula have been honored with National Award of Recognition in other fields too.

Recipients

Explanatory notes

References

External links
 Official Page for National Awards, Maldives

Awards established in 1979
1979 establishments in the Maldives